Martin Saunders may refer to:
 Martin Saunders, English musician, vocalist with The Twang
 Martin Saunders (chemist), American chemist, member of the United States National Academy of Sciences